Conrad Johan Bartholdy  (12 March 1853 – 6 December 1904) was a Danish organist, composer, singing teacher, conductor and author of music theory books. He was honored as a Titular Professor for the year 1900.

Bartholdy was born in Hammel, the son of the local pharmacist and was active as a student in Århus Cathedral from 1872. He began after school to study political science, but interrupted his studies to get a musical education. Among his teachers were Johann Christian Gebauer (theory) and Edmund Neupert (piano).

References

This article was initially translated from the Danish Wikipedia.

External links
 

Danish composers
Male composers
Danish classical organists
Male classical organists
Danish conductors (music)
Male conductors (music)
1853 births
1904 deaths
People from Favrskov Municipality
19th-century Danish male musicians
19th-century organists